Wily or WILY could refer to:

Computing and technology
Wily (text editor), a text editor for Unix computer systems
Wily Technology, American software company
Ubuntu 15.10, the version of Ubuntu released in October 2015 with code name Wily Werewolf

Arts, entertainment, and media
WILY, a radio station (1210 AM) licensed to Centralia, Illinois, United States
Dr. Wily, a video game character
WWNL, a radio station (1080 AM) licensed to Pittsburgh, Pennsylvania, United States, known as WILY 1947 to 1957

People
Wily Mo Peña (born 1982), Dominican baseball player
Wily Peralta (born 1989), Dominican baseball player

See also
 Willy (disambiguation)
 Wiley (disambiguation)
 Wyle (disambiguation)
 Wylie (disambiguation)
 Wyllie
 Wylye (disambiguation)